USS Mesa Verde (LPD-19) is the third  of the United States Navy. She is the first U.S. Navy warship to be named after the Mesa Verde National Park in the U.S. state of Colorado.

History
The contract to build Mesa Verde was awarded on 29 February 2000 to Northrop Grumman Ship Systems of Pascagoula, Mississippi, and her keel was laid down on 25 February 2003. She was launched on 19 November 2004, and christened on 15 January 2005 with Linda Price Campbell, wife of former Senator Ben Nighthorse Campbell of Colorado, serving as the ship's sponsor.  The ship was commissioned on 15 December 2007 in Panama City, Florida.

References 
This article contains information from the Naval Vessel Registry and various other United States Navy Web sites.

External links 

 
 NavSource.org: USS Mesa Verde
 

 

2004 ships
San Antonio-class amphibious transport docks
Ships built in Pascagoula, Mississippi